The 16th Mieczysław Połukard Criterium of Polish Speedway League Aces was the 1997 version of the Mieczysław Połukard Criterium of Polish Speedway Leagues Aces. It took place on March 23 in the Polonia Stadium in Bydgoszcz, Poland.

Starting positions draw 

 Roman Jankowski - Unia Leszno
 Robert Dados - BB-GKM Grudziądz
 Jacek Gollob - Jutrzenka-Polonia Bydgoszcz
 Robert Sawina - Start Gniezno
 Tomasz Gollob - Jutrzenka-Polonia Bydgoszcz
 Jacek Krzyżaniak - Apator-DGG Toruń
 Rafał Dobrucki - Polonia-Philips Piła
 Sebastian Ułamek - Włókniarz-Malma Częstochowa
 Piotr Protasiewicz - Jutrzenka-Polonia Bydgoszcz
 Dariusz Śledź - Atlas Wrocław
 Piotr Świst - Pergo Gorzów Wlkp.
 Andrzej Huszcza - ZKŻ Polmos Zielona Góra
 Sławomir Drabik - Włókniarz-Malma Częstochowa
 Tomasz Bajerski - Pergo Gorzów Wlkp.
 Jacek Gomólski - Jutrzenka-Polonia Bydgoszcz
 Jarosław Olszewski - Polonia-Philips Piła
 (R1) Eugeniusz Tudzież - Jutrzenka-Polonia Bydgoszcz

Heat details

Sources 
 Roman Lach - Polish Speedway Almanac

See also 

Criterium of Aces
Mieczyslaw Polukard
Mieczysław Połukard Criterium of Polish Speedway Leagues Aces